Peter Atherton may refer to:
 Peter Atherton (Massachusetts politician) (1705–1764), a Massachusetts colonial leader
 Peter Atherton (footballer) (born 1970), English footballer
 Peter Atherton (manufacturer) (1741–1799), British designer of instruments, inventor and manufacturer of textile machinery
 Peter Lee Atherton (1862–1939), American businessman, property developer, investor and politician